Canadian Forces Base Comox , commonly referred to as CFB Comox or 19 Wing, is a Canadian Forces Base located  north northeast of Comox, Vancouver Island, British Columbia. It is primarily operated as an air force base by the Royal Canadian Air Force (RCAF) and is one of two bases in the country using the CP-140 Aurora anti-submarine/maritime patrol and surveillance aircraft. Its primary RCAF lodger unit is 19 Wing, commonly referred to as 19 Wing Comox.

CFB Comox's airfield is also used by civilian aircraft. The civilian passenger terminal building operations are called the Comox Valley Airport and are operated by the Comox Valley Airport Commission.

The airport is classified as an airport of entry by Nav Canada and is staffed by the Canada Border Services Agency (CBSA).

History

Military air base operations
The Royal Air Force (RAF) constructed the airfield at the strategic location of Comox in spring 1942. RAF Station Comox was built to guard against any possible Japanese threat to North America.

The aerodrome was listed as "Under construction - Serviceable" with two runways as follows:

In 1943, the RCAF took over control of the airfield, renaming the facility RCAF Station Comox. The RCAF used Comox for training crews of transport aircraft for the rest of World War II, basing a training squadron flying the Douglas Dakota in 1944.

From 1946 until 1952 the base was mothballed until tensions resulting from the Korean War and Cold War prompted reactivation and the establishment of a permanent RCAF base on Canada's Pacific coast.

No. 407 Maritime Patrol Squadron initially used the Avro Lancaster then Lockheed P2V Neptune, followed by the Canadair CP-107 Argus and now the Lockheed CP-140 Aurora.

No. 409 All Weather Fighter Interceptor Squadron was equipped with the Canadair CT-33 Silver Star and Avro CF-100 Canuck, followed by the McDonnell CF-101 Voodoo, an example of which can be found on display at the main entrance of 19 Wing.

In 1954, Comox became home to a Pinetree Line radar early-warning station, operated by the 51 Aircraft Control and Warning Squadron (radar). This facility was closed in June 1958 with the advent of more advanced radar systems such as the Mid-Canada Line and the Distant Early Warning Line (DEW Line).

In 1964, RCAF Station Sea Island near Vancouver International Airport was closed and turned over to the Canadian Coast Guard. Sea Island's 121 Composite Unit moved to Comox and was reorganized as 442 Transport and Rescue Squadron, flying the Grumman HU-16 Albatross fixed-wing and Piasecki H-21 helicopter, later re-equipping with the CH-113 Labrador and CC-115 Buffalo. The Labrador helicopter was replaced with the AgustaWestland CH-149 Cormorant starting in 2001.

On February 1, 1968, the RCAF merged with the Royal Canadian Navy (RCN) and Canadian Army to form the unified Canadian Forces. RCAF Station Comox was renamed Canadian Forces Base Comox, shortened to CFB Comox. During a 1975 reorganization of the Canadian Forces, Air Command (AIRCOM) was created to operate the air element.

After CFB Comox began sharing the airport with scheduled airlines and other civilian aircraft, a Boeing 747 flown by Northwest Airlines became the first jumbo jet to operate into the field when it made an emergency landing there on June 5, 1979.  The flight, chartered by the U.S. military to transport 368 active duty personnel and their families from Travis Air Force Base to Japan and South Korea, was over Cape Scott following an intermediate stop at Seattle–Tacoma International Airport when fire broke out in one of the aircraft's engines. Efforts to extinguish the flames were unsuccessful; the crew declared an emergency and requested permission to land on the  runway at CFB Comox. Though no flames were visible, the fire warning light was still flashing in the cockpit as the plane landed. There were no injuries to the passengers or to the 13 crew members.  Base officials, practiced at hosting large numbers of Canadian Forces personnel, ensured that the plane's occupants were comfortable while awaiting a new aircraft to carry them to their destinations.

In 1980, 407 Squadron began re-equipping with the Lockheed CP-140 Aurora. In 1984, 409 Squadron moved from CFB Comox to CFB Cold Lake leaving the base with the duties of coastal patrol, anti-submarine and transport missions, and search and rescue (SAR) missions.

In 1989, a strike force of United States Air Force KC-135E tankers from the Washington Air National Guard deployed to CFB Comox as part of the annual Global Shield Exercise. The deployment, which included vehicles, equipment and armed personnel arriving by landing craft at a local beach, prompting some locals to ask whether the United States was invading Canada.

Commercial airline service

During the late 1950s, Pacific Western Airlines was serving the airfield with nonstop and one-stop direct flights to Vancouver operated with Douglas DC-3 aircraft with the one-stop service being flown via Campbell River, British Columbia. By the early 1960s, the airline had expanded their DC-3 service with nonstop flights to Port Hardy as well.  Pacific Western then introduced turboprop service with the Convair 640 (which the airline called the "Javelin Jet-Prop") and was continuing to operate nonstop flights to Vancouver, Port Hardy, and Campbell River during the late 1960s.  The airline then began operating jet service into the airfield with the Boeing 737-200 and in 1975 was operating two nonstop 737 flights a day to Vancouver.  Pacific Western would continue to serve Comox with Boeing 737-200 jet flights through the mid-1980s by which time the air carrier had become an all-jet airline.  By 1995, the airfield no longer had jet service with flights to Vancouver being operated by either Air BC flying Air Canada Connector code share service with de Havilland Canada DHC-8 Dash 8 turboprops or by Time Air operating Canadian Airlines Partner codeshare service with Dash 8 and Short 360 turboprops.  According to the Official Airline Guide (OAG), Air BC and Time Air were operating a combined total of ten round trip nonstop flights on weekdays between Comox and Vancouver at this time. 

In 2003 the airport received a complete renovation, increasing the flow of people in the airport by almost 400 people, as well as building a customs area which was much needed. In the early 2000's Air Transat and Sunwing were flying to Mexico during the winter months, but have discontinued service about a decade ago.   

In April 2012, a Korean Air 777 airliner was forced to make an emergency landing at Comox after the airline received a bomb threat. The flight was diverted to the airbase at Comox, on Vancouver Island, escorted by U.S. air force F-15 fighter jets that had been scrambled from Portland, Ore. Korean Air Flight 72, with 149 people on board, had taken off from Vancouver International Airport headed for Seoul, South Korea, at 2:30 p.m. PT Tuesday. The crew turned back off the north coast of B.C. after a bomb threat was made in a telephone call. it was one of the largest passenger airlines to fly into Comox.

Military use 

CFB Comox is the primary air defense installation on Canada's Pacific coast and serves as the home base for maritime patrol/anti-submarine aircraft and fixed-wing and rotary-wing search and rescue (SAR) aircraft.

Its primary lodger unit, 19 Wing, has two operational squadrons:

 407 Maritime Patrol Squadron flying the Lockheed CP-140 Aurora
 442 Transport and Rescue Squadron flying the CC-295 Kingfisher fixed-wing aircraft and AgustaWestland CH-149 Cormorant rotary-wing aircraft
 418 Search and Rescue Operational Training Squadron flying the CC-295 Kingfisher.

19 Wing also includes the 19 Air Maintenance Squadron, and a number of other organizations.

CFB Comox is the location of the Canadian Forces School of Search and Rescue, where all para-rescue specialists in the Canadian Forces, known as Search And Rescue Technicians or "SAR Techs", undergo training.

CFB Comox serves as a forward operating base for temporary deployments of the McDonnell Douglas CF-18 Hornet fighter-interceptor.

Every April, the Snowbirds practice at 19 Wing Comox.

CFB Comox is used by the Royal Canadian Air Cadets for glider and powered flight training, training glider pilots on Schweizer SGS 2-33As and housing the cadets training on Cessna 172s respectively in the summer months. Training for the Advanced Aviation Air Cadet Course is also hosted at CFB Comox. An annex of CFB Comox, Annex A "Goose Spit", is used by the Royal Canadian Sea Cadets for CSTC HMCS Quadra where 600 sea cadets undergo training in the basic trades of music (combined with Army and Air cadets), gunnery, boatswain, and sail. It also trains cadets in three specialty trades marine engineering, shipwright, and silver sail. The annex is also host to the local Canadian Forces Sail Association.

CFB Comox is planned to be one of the two Canadian bases operating armed drones in the late 2020s, the other being CFB Greenwood in Nova Scotia.

Civilian use
CFB Comox shares the airfield with a civilian terminal for commercial flights; WestJet,  Pacific Coastal Airlines have been servicing the airport since 2000, Air Canada has been serving the airport off and on from 2000-2008 then from 2015 to present. Flair Airlines started service in 2022 and Swoop will start flights later in 2022  marking the first low-cost airlines starting service for the airport.

The base hosts a biennial airshow (although not held from 2005 to 2012) to celebrate Canadian Forces Day.

The base is also home to the Comox Air Force Museum which features several aircraft and other historical exhibits.

The base is a primary employer in the Comox Valley.

Comox Airport (YQQ)

Facilities 
The Comox Airport has a number of facilities available. Two major businesses are in the airport terminal: On the Fly Café and Mid Island Gifts. There is also a bike repair station on-site.

The Airport has its own fuel service, Shell Aviation Canada and provides Jet A1fuel and Jet A1 fuel with FSII.

YQQ has a CANPASS Customs area for international arrivals.

There are three car rental agencies at YQQ: Budget Car, Enterprise and National Car Rental

Terminal 

YQQ has a 36,000 Square foot terminal with 1,000 square feet for retail,  the airport has 6 aircraft parking spots and 300 on site parking and 140 overflow parking areas. YQQs hold room can seat about 200 people.  There are two baggage carrousels for arrivals.

COVID-19 pandemic
Throughout the COVID-19 pandemic passenger service dipped to few flights per week, with Pacific Coastal Airlines and Air Canada pulling service temporarily from the airport, and WestJet pulling service from Edmonton and Vancouver, WestJet reduced flights to Calgary to one flight every couple of days. Passenger numbers for the Comox Airport plunged in 2020 as a direct result of the pandemic. In 2019 the airport had more than 400,000 passengers, and in 2020 it was under 200,000 passengers. WestJet announced new routes from the airport for the summer of 2021, from Comox to Toronto, and WestJet link service to Vancouver. Air Canada has resumed its service to Vancouver.

Fall 2021 and Beyond 
In October 2021, Flair Airlines announced that they would be starting flights from Comox to Calgary and Edmonton starting late March 2022.  It was  unclear if WestJet plans on resuming service to Puerto Vallarta for the winter season of 2021-2022, due to uncertainly around COVID-19 and the travel restrictions in Canada.

On November 15, 2021, Swoop Airlines announce that they will commence three times weekly service from Edmonton, using their modern fleet of Boeing 737-800NG aircraft, on Thursday, June 9, 2022. “Swoop’s arrival will generate a lot of excitement for travelers looking for affordable options to reconnect with their friends and family,” said Mike Atkins, Comox Valley Airport’s CEO. “We are delighted to have Swoop support travel to the Comox Valley, particularly for our tourism partners ready to welcome visitors to the spectacular region we serve"

On 18 November 2021, 22 people were injured in an explosion at the barracks at CFB Comox. Sixteen military members and six civilians were injured on Thursday after an explosion took place at a barracks building that was undergoing renovations. 59 people were housed in the building, though not everyone was inside of the building at the time of the blast.

During the flooding in BC, members from CFB Comox assisted in rescuing people stranded after flooding and mudslides washed out multiple sections of Highway 7 near Agassiz. In the 48 hours leading up to the CAF request for assistance, the Royal Canadian Air Force dispatched three Cormorant helicopters from 442 Transport and Rescue Squadron to airlift more than 300 people, 26 dogs and one cat to safety.

Airlines and destinations

Passenger numbers for Comox Airport

See also
 List of airports on Vancouver Island
 Comox Valley
 442 Transport and Rescue Squadron

References

External links
19 Wing Comox official website
Passenger terminal
Page about this airport on COPA's Places to Fly airport directory
Comox Air Force Museum (located at 19 Wing) website

Military airbases in British Columbia
Comox
Comox Valley Regional District
Military history of British Columbia